This is a list of foreign ministers of Saint Lucia.

1979: John Compton
1979–1981: George Odlum
1981–1982: Peter Josie
1982–1987: John Compton
1987–1992: Neville Cenac
1992–1996: George Mallet
1996–1997: Vaughan Lewis
1997–2001: George Odlum
2001–2004: Julian Hunte
2004–2006: Petrus Compton
2006–2007: Rufus Bousquet
2007–2009: Stephenson King
2009–2011: Rufus Bousquet
2011–2016: Alva Baptiste
2016–2021:  Allen Chastanet
2021–present: Alva Baptiste

Sources
Rulers.org – Foreign ministers S–Z

Foreign
Foreign Affairs
Foreign Ministers of Saint Lucia